LA 11, LA-11, La-11 or LA11 may refer to:

 Lavochkin La-11, a Cold War-era Soviet fighter aircraft
 LA11, a postcode district in South Cumbria within the LA postcode area
 Louisiana's 11th State Senate district, a state senate district representing the northern parts of Greater New Orleans in St. Tammany and Tangipahoa Parishes along Lake Pontchartrain
 Louisiana's 11th House of Representatives District, a district in the Louisiana House of Representatives representing parts of Bienville, Claiborne and Lincoln Parishes
 Los Angeles City Council District 11, representing the Westside of the city to the Pacific Ocean
 Constituency LA-11, a constituency of the Azad Jammu and Kashmir Legislative Assembly in Pakistan